Morganson's Finish is a 1926 American silent drama film directed by Fred Windemere and starring Anita Stewart, Johnnie Walker and Mahlon Hamilton.

Cast
 Anita Stewart as Barbara Wesley 
 Johnnie Walker as Dick Gilbert 
 Mahlon Hamilton as Dan Morganson 
 Victor Potel as Ole Jensen 
 Crauford Kent as G.T. Williams 
 Rose Tapley as Doctor's Wife

References

Bibliography
 Munden, Kenneth White. The American Film Institute Catalog of Motion Pictures Produced in the United States, Part 1. University of California Press, 1997.

External links

1926 films
1926 drama films
Silent American drama films
Films directed by Fred Windemere
American silent feature films
1920s English-language films
Tiffany Pictures films
American black-and-white films
Films based on works by Jack London
1920s American films